The CFL Combine (formerly known as the Evaluation Camp or E-Camp) is a three-day program in which athletes from Canadian universities and Canadians in the NCAA are scouted by general managers, coaches and scouts of the Canadian Football League (CFL). The goal of the camp is for the nine CFL franchises to have a better idea of whom they would like to draft in the CFL draft which usually takes place roughly six weeks after the camp. The first combined Evaluation Camp took place in 2000 in Toronto and continued every year in Toronto until 2016 when it was announced that Regina, Saskatchewan would host the combine in 2017. It was also suggested that the league would begin rotating the Combine hosts every year. Winnipeg hosted in 2018 and the event returned to Toronto with the hiatus of the CFL Week event.

Since 2014, there have been regional combines in Western Canada, Montreal and Toronto in the week prior to the national combine. The regional combines provide a wider scope of athletes with the opportunity to be evaluated by CFL personnel. Players are then selected from these combines to participate in the National Combine to compete with athletes already invited there. The 2020 Combine was cancelled and the 2021 Combine was held remotely due to the COVID-19 pandemic.

Events
Athletes are measured to compare the various physical builds of certain athletes. Some of the qualities measured include; height, weight, hand size, arm length, flexibility. The bench press is one of the most exciting drills at E-Camp, because it evaluates both the athletes strength and muscular endurance. For certain positions the vertical jump analysis provides valuable information regarding the leaping ability of an athlete. The 40-yard dash is another popular event at the evaluation camp. Athletes are timed at the 10, 20 and 40 m intervals, each one has greater significance for certain positions. A good test of an athlete's lower body explosion capabilities is how he fares in the broad jump test. To test acceleration and agility athletes are tested in both the short shuttle and the 3-cone drill. Two of the more important parts of the evaluation are the interviews with the teams and the one-on-one drills.

History

2012
Michael Van Praet, defensive lineman of the Western Ontario Mustangs, won the bench press competition with 38 reps. Top-ranked prospect Ben Heenan came second with 32 repetitions. Keenan MacDougall led all broad jumpers with a score of 10 feet and 7 and half inches and Dylan Hollohan won the shuttle drill and vertical jump competition leaping 42.5 inches. Shamawd Chambers, wide receiver from Wilfrid Laurier, led all athletes running an electronically timed 4.42 40-yard dash.

2013
As of the 2013 CFL Combine the league re-branded the evaluation so that it is not longer referred to as E-Camp but rather the CFL Combine. The 2013 CFL Combine took place March 22–24. For the first time in its history the evaluation was expanded to include two regional combines (Edmonton and Montreal) prior to the main E-Camp taking place in Toronto. The regional combine in Edmonton took place March 18, in Commonwealth Stadium. The Montreal combine took place on March 20, in Université Laval Stadium. The Edmonton combine had 38 and the Montreal combine had 30 athletes. Michael Klassen, defensive lineman from the University of Calgary, and Jermaine Gabriel, defensive back from the Calgary Colts, both advanced out of the Edmonton combine. From out of the Montreal combine, Kristopher Robertson from the Concordia Stingers was invited to the main combine in Toronto.

Elie Ngoyi, a defensive lineman from the Bishop's Gaiters, won the bench press competition with 40 repetitions. Kristopher Robertson from the Concordia Stingers (who was invited from the Montreal combine) had the fastest 40-yard dash, clocking in at 4.42 seconds. Robertson also led the vertical jump (43 inches) and the broad jump (10 feet, 5 inches). Guillaume Rioux from the Laval Rouge et Or won the Shuffle drill with a time of 3.91 seconds. The three-cone drill was won by Simon Le Marquand from the Ottawa Gee-Gees, with a time of 6.84 seconds. As a result of Kristopher Robertson's impressive showings at both the Montreal regional combine and the main combine in Toronto, he soared to being the 11th overall selection in the 2013 CFL Draft.

2014 
The 2014 CFL Combine was scheduled for the weekend of March 21–23. On March 4, 2014, the CFL announced that the 2014 combine would include three regional combines (Edmonton, Montreal and Toronto) prior to the main national combine. The regional combines were held from March 17 through 20. Four athletes were advanced to the national combine out of the regional Toronto combine, with the Edmonton and Montreal combines both advancing five players.

David Menard, defensive linemen from Montreal, had the most bench reps with 32. Adam Thibault, defensive back from Laval ran the fastest 40-yard dash, clocking in at 4.454 seconds. Thibault also had the fastest time in the shuffle drill with a time of 4.03. Evan Pszczonak, wide receiver from Windsor, had the highest vertical jump of 40.0 inches. Andrew Lue, defensive back from Queen's, had the longest broad jump, leaping 10 feet 5 inches. The best three-cone drill time was by Antoine Pruneau, defensive back, Montreal, with a time of 6.78 seconds.

2015 
Regional combines were held in Edmonton, Montreal, and Toronto in the week leading up to the national combine in Toronto, which took place March 27 to 29, 2015. Eleven athletes from the three regional combines were invited to the national combine in Toronto. The 2015 CFL Draft class was believed to be the deepest in many years – a result of both CFL eligibility rules and increasing quality of coaching and systems in the high school and university level across Canada. Several all-time CFL Combine records were broken in 2015, starting with the 40-yard dash. Regina Rams CB Tevaughn Campbell ran the fastest electronically timed 40-yard dash with 4.35 seconds. Wilfrid Laurier's Chris Ackie set the new broad jump record leaping 10 feet 11.5 inches, surpassing Brian Nugent's 2002 record of 10’ 10.5″. Chris Ackie also led all prospects with a vertical jump of 40 inches. Byron Archambault set the record for most bench press reps by a linebacker with 41, second only across all positions to Michael Knill's 47 in 2011. Archambault led all prospects in the shuttle drill with a speed of 4.18 seconds. Finally, WR Nic Demski from Manitoba was the only athlete to run a sub-7-second three-cone drill, with a time of 6.91 seconds.

2016 
In 2016, regional combines were again held in Edmonton, Montreal, and Toronto with 17 players being added to the National combine roster. The Edmonton combine was held on March 7, the Montreal combine was on March 9, the Toronto combine was held on March 10, and the National combine in Toronto took place from March 11 to March 13. Queen's receiver Doug Corby had the fastest 40-yard dash with 4.505 seconds. Felix Faubert-Lussier of Laval had the best three-cone drill with a time of 6.73 seconds and Shaq Johnson had the best broad jump result with a distance of 11'0.0". Philippe Gagnon had the best bench press result with 40 repetitions.

2017 
On November 15, 2016 the league announced that Regina, Saskatchewan would host the CFL Combine, as part of the larger CFL Week; which is an event designed to engage fans and the media during the off-season. The National Combine took place March 23–26 at Evraz Place, in Regina. This was the first time that the National Combine was held outside Toronto. In mid-March the CFL announced it would expand its coverage of the 2017 Combine with more analysis and footage streamed on CFL.ca than in previous years. The Eastern Regional Combine took place on March 10 in Montreal, and the Ontario Regional Combine took place on March 17 in Toronto. For the first time the Western Regional Combine was not held in Edmonton, but instead took place in Regina on March 23, just before the National Combine. In total 50 players competed in the 2017 Combine, with 15 being promoted from the 3 regional combines.

* indicates a result from a regional combine event

2018 
For the second consecutive season, the CFL paired CFL Week with the combine and had Winnipeg host both. The Eastern Regional Combine was held in Montreal on March 7, the Ontario Regional Combine was held in Toronto on March 9, and the Western Regional Combine was held March 22; two days before the main combine on March 24 and March 25.

* indicates a result from a regional combine event

2019 
The 2019 National Combine moved back to Toronto amidst labour negotiations and a request by the Canadian Football League Players' Association to players not to make public appearances on behalf of the league in the offseason. This meant that there would be no CFL Week in 2019 and that Toronto would again host the National Combine from March 22 to March 24. The Western Regional Combine was hosted by Edmonton on March 11, the Eastern Regional Combine was hosted by Montreal on March 13, and the Ontario Regional Combine was hosted by Toronto on March 21.

* indicates a result from a regional combine event

2020 
The 2020 National Combine was to be held in Toronto for the second straight year from March 26, 2020 to March 28, 2020. The Ontario Regional Combine was also going be in Toronto on March 12, 2020; the Eastern Regional Combine was to be held in Montreal on March 13, 2020, and the Western Regional Combine in Edmonton was to take place on March 20, 2020. However, on March 12, 2020, the CFL announced that the events were to be cancelled due to the COVID-19 pandemic.

2021 
The 2021 National Combine and Regional Combine were held virtually due to the ongoing COVID-19 pandemic in Canada. Testing, football drills, and interviews were conducted remotely through video.

2022 
The 2022 National Combine was held in-person for the first time since 2019 and took place in Toronto from March 26 to March 27. The Ontario Regional Combine was hosted by Waterloo on March 10, the Eastern Regional Combine was hosted by Montreal on March 11, and the Western Regional Combine was hosted by Edmonton on March 18.

* indicates a result from a regional combine event

2023 
The 2023 National Combine is scheduled to be held in Edmonton and will expand to five days from March 22 to March 26, 2023. The three regional combines will be replaced by one CFL Invitational Combine and will be hosted by the Feridun Hamdullahpur Field House on the campus of the University of Waterloo in Waterloo, Ontario, on March 3, 2023.

References

Canadian College Draft
Canadian football